During the 1954–55 season Bury competed in the Football League Second Division where they finished in 13th position with 41 points. In the FA Cup Bury were drawn against fellow Second Division side Stoke City in the third round which went to a fourth replay with Stoke finally winning 3–2 after 9 hours and 22 minutes of football in the longest FA Cup tie between two professional teams.

Final league table

Second Division

Results

Legend

Football League Second Division

FA Cup

Squad

References
 1954–55 Bury season at Statto.com
 1954–55 Bury season at Soccerway.com (use drop down list to select relevant season)

External links

Bury F.C. seasons
Bury